Tula Rodríguez is a Peruvian exotic dancer. She played the main role of Katlyn in the 2006 film Chicha tu madre.

Filmography
Pantaleón y las visitadoras (2000) as Peludita
"Luciana y Nicolás" (2003) TV series as Juanita
"Locas pasiones" (2004) TV series
"Las Vírgenes de la cumbia" (2005) TV series
"Amores como el nuestro" as Maribel Romero (2006)
"Ferrando, de pura sangre" (2006) TV mini-series
Chicha tu madre (2006) .... Katlyn
 Avenida Perú (2013) as Yesenia Amasifuén

External links

Peruvian female dancers
Peruvian vedettes
Living people
Year of birth missing (living people)